Christopher Whitelaw Pine (born August 26, 1980) is an American actor. He is best known for his roles as James T. Kirk in the Star Trek reboot film series (2009–present); Steve Trevor in the DC Extended Universe films Wonder Woman (2017) and Wonder Woman 1984 (2020); Will Colson in Unstoppable (2010); and Toby Howard in Hell or High Water (2016).

Pine first rose to prominence for his roles in romcoms as Lord Devereaux in The Princess Diaries 2 (2004) and Jake Hardin in Just My Luck (2006). His roles also include Cinderella's Prince in Into the Woods (2014); Jack Ryan in Jack Ryan: Shadow Recruit (2014); Bernie Webber in The Finest Hours (2016); Dr. Alexander Murry in A Wrinkle in Time (2018); and Robert the Bruce in Outlaw King. Pine voiced Jack Frost in Rise of the Guardians (2012).

Early life
Pine was born on August 26, 1980 in Los Angeles, California. His father, Robert Pine, is an actor who co-starred on CHiPs as Sergeant Joseph Getraer, while his mother, Gwynne Gilford, is a former actress who became a psychotherapist. He has an older sister, Katherine, who has also acted. His maternal grandmother, Anne Gwynne, was a Hollywood actress. His maternal grandfather, Max M. Gilford, who came from a Russian Jewish family, was an attorney who was elected president of the Hollywood Bar Association. His uncle, Greg Max Gilford, is a former recording artist for Dunhill Records, who became a computer consultant, then later a Recovery Mentor/Support Specialist for United Healthcare.

Pine attended the Oakwood School for high school, which he described as "a Jewish liberal school in the Valley," then went on to graduate from the University of California, Berkeley in 2002 with a Bachelor of Arts in English. While in college, Pine wanted to find a "place where he'd belong", and was not interested in joining a fraternity. Instead, he began doing theater. As a member of the UC Berkeley Theater Department, Pine performed in a Caryl Churchill play at La Val's Subterranean Theater and performed Orestes and Shakespeare at Zellerbach Hall. 

He was an exchange student at the University of Leeds in the United Kingdom for one year. After graduating from Berkeley, he attended the Williamstown Theatre Festival, and he studied at the American Conservatory Theater in San Francisco.

Career

2003–2008: Early roles
Pine's first acting role was in a 2003 episode of ER; the same year, he also appeared in episodes of The Guardian and CSI: Miami.

In 2004, he appeared in Why Germany?, a short film; and in The Princess Diaries 2: Royal Engagement. Pine played the part of Nicholas Devereaux, the love interest of Anne Hathaway's leading character. In 2005, Pine appeared in an episode of the series Six Feet Under, as well as in Confession, an independent film that was released directly to video, and The Bulls, another short film.

Pine appeared in the television Surrender, Dorothy which aired in early 2006. He played Jake Hardin in the American film Just My Luck, a romantic comedy in which he starred opposite Lindsay Lohan. The film was released on May 12, 2006. Later that year, Pine appeared in the comedy Blind Dating, and in the action film Smokin' Aces. Pine did the one-man play The Atheist, at Center Stage, New York, in late 2006. In 2007, he starred opposite Scott Wolf in the Los Angeles production of Neil LaBute's play Fat Pig, winning positive reviews for his depiction of a competitive, alpha-male friend. He portrayed real-life Napa Valley vintner Bo Barrett in the 2008 film Bottle Shock.

2009–2016: Star Trek and worldwide recognition

In 2007, Pine turned down a role in a film adaptation of White Jazz, to accept the part of James T. Kirk in the 2009 Star Trek film, which was released to critical and viewer acclaim in May of that year. That same month, he made a brief appearance promoting the film on Saturday Night Live, with co-stars Zachary Quinto and Leonard Nimoy. During the rest of the summer of 2009, he appeared in the Los Angeles production of the Beau Willimon play Farragut North. Pine appeared in the Los Angeles production of The Lieutenant of Inishmore during the summer of 2010, for which he won the Los Angeles Drama Critics Circle's lead appearance award.

In the fall of 2009, Pine began filming the action film Unstoppable, directed by Tony Scott and written by Mark Bomback, which was released in November 2010. In the film, he played a young train conductor who helped a veteran railroad engineer (Denzel Washington) stop an unmanned, half mile long runaway freight train carrying toxic liquids and poisonous gases from wiping out a nearby city. The Hollywood Reporter named Pine as one of the young male actors who are "pushing—or being pushed" into taking over Hollywood as the new "A-List."

In 2011, Pine sat down with the actor who originated the role of Captain Kirk more than forty years earlier, William Shatner, for the feature length documentary The Captains, which Shatner wrote and directed. The film sees Shatner interview Pine about his career and how it felt to take the role of Kirk for the 2009 movie. Their interview features a scene where the pair arm wrestles; pictures of this incident "went viral" leading to Internet headlines such as "Kirk v. Kirk" and others.

Pine filmed the romantic comedy This Means War, with Reese Witherspoon and Tom Hardy, during the fall of 2010, in Vancouver. This Means War was released in February 2012. Pine voiced the character of Jack Frost in Rise of the Guardians. Pine co-starred with Elizabeth Banks, Olivia Wilde, and Michelle Pfeiffer in the family drama People Like Us, which was filmed in early 2011 and released in June 2012. He reprised the role of Captain Kirk in the sequel to 2009's Star Trek, titled Star Trek Into Darkness, released in the US on May 15, 2013.

In 2009, Pine entered talks to play CIA analyst Jack Ryan in a reboot of Tom Clancy's novels. He starred in Jack Ryan: Shadow Recruit, which was released in 2014. Pine was the fourth actor to play the character, after Alec Baldwin, Harrison Ford, and Ben Affleck. In 2014, Pine was in talks to star in a thriller about the United States Coast Guard, The Finest Hours, released in January 2016. He guest-starred in Netflix's Wet Hot American Summer: First Day of Camp and lent his voice for SuperMansion in 2015.

In May 2015, Pine was confirmed to play one of the Howard brothers, along with Ben Foster, in Hell or High Water (originally called Comancheria). After premiering at the 2016 Cannes Film Festival, the film was released in August 2016. Clayton Davis of Variety found Pine's performance in the film to be his best, writing that Pine "shows his reserved range as a leading man." Pine reprised the role of Captain Kirk in Star Trek Beyond. Filming began in June 2015 in Canada, and it was released in the US on July 22, 2016. In July 2016, he received a Primetime Emmy Award nomination for Outstanding Character Voice-Over Performance for his work on the series SuperMansion. That same year, Pine was featured on singer Barbra Streisand's album Encore: Movie Partners Sing Broadway, in which the two duetted on a medley of the songs "I'll Be Seeing You" and "I've Grown Accustomed to Her Face".

2017–present: Wonder Woman and continued film roles
In 2015, Pine was cast as Steve Trevor, opposite Gal Gadot, in the superhero film Wonder Woman. The film was released in June 2017 to positive reviews. Also in 2017, he reprised his roles in the second season of SuperMansion and the film Wet Hot American Summer: Ten Years Later, guest-starred in the third season of Angie Tribeca (including an episode where his father was also a guest star), and narrated the season two finale episode of National Geographic's Breakthrough.

In 2018, Pine played Dr. Alexander Murry in the fantasy film A Wrinkle in Time, based on the novel of the same name, and starred as Robert the Bruce in Outlaw King. The latter project began filming on August 21, 2017, in Scotland, and was released on Netflix on November 9, 2018. Also that year, Pine voiced a version of Peter Parker / Spider-Man in the animated film Spider-Man: Into the Spider-Verse. In August 2018, it was reported that Pine would not be reprising his role as Captain Kirk in the fourth film of the Star Trek film series after contract negotiations fell through.

In July 2017, the US cable network TNT announced Pine would play the role of Jay Singletary in a six-episode television drama, One Day She'll Darken. He also served as an executive producer alongside director Patty Jenkins and writer Sam Sheridan. The show, ultimately titled I Am the Night, began airing in January 2019.

In 2020, Pine appeared as Westley in Home Movie: The Princess Bride for Quibi to raise money for World Central Kitchen. On June 13, 2018, Patty Jenkins announced that Pine would appear in the Wonder Woman sequel, titled Wonder Woman 1984, as Steve Trevor. The film was released in December 2020.

After Pine became attached to star in a film adaptation of the novel All the Old Knives in 2017, Amazon Studios picked up the film in 2020, with Pine and Thandiwe Newton starring and Janus Metz Pedersen directing. Pine also executive produced the film. The film was released in limited theaters and on streaming on Amazon Prime Video on April 8, 2022.

Pine executive produced and starred in the 2022 action-thriller The Contractor, and appeared in Don't Worry Darling, a psychological thriller film directed by Olivia Wilde, released in September 2022.

Upcoming projects
In September 2017, it was announced that Pine was slated to star as Robert F. Kennedy in a Hulu limited series based on the Larry Tye biography Bobby Kennedy: The Making of a Liberal Icon. He will also serve as an executive producer for the series. In August 2019, it was reported that Pine was set to play Walter Cronkite in Newsflash, a drama film about how media reported the Assassination of John F. Kennedy.

In December 2020, it was announced that Pine will star in Dungeons & Dragons: Honor Among Thieves, a film based on the role-playing game of the same name. In February 2022, it was announced that Pine will make his directorial debut with Poolman and will also play the lead.

Personal life
Pine has stated, "I definitely have a spiritual outlook ... I am not a religious guy, I am probably agnostic."

Pine was in a relationship with South African model Dominique Piek from late 2011 to early 2013. He was in a relationship with British actress Annabelle Wallis from 2018 to early 2022. 

On March 1, 2014, while filming Z for Zachariah in New Zealand, Pine was arrested by police near Methven after failing to pass a routine roadside breath alcohol test. He pleaded guilty to drunk driving on March 17, stating that he drank four vodkas at a local pub. Pine was disqualified from driving in New Zealand for six months and ordered to pay NZ$93 in reparation. He had a clean record, and the judge said that "the incident was out of character".

Political views 

Politically, Pine has called himself a "left-leaning liberal". He has stated that both Democrats and Republicans tend to be interchangeable when it comes to certain actions, citing President Obama's strengthening of the controversial Patriot Act.

During the 2016 presidential campaign, Pine along with fellow Star Trek coworkers J. J. Abrams, John Cho, Simon Pegg, Zachary Quinto, Zoe Saldana, Karl Urban, George Takei, Justin Lin, Bryan Fuller, and Adam Nimoy, endorsed a movement called Trek Against Trump. The movement endorsed Hillary Clinton. On November 1, 2016, Pine, along with director Joss Whedon, released a video urging people to vote in the upcoming elections. While the video was a parody of Congress in general, certain commentators took the video to represent the Republican Congress. In 2020, Pine supported Joe Biden's presidential campaign.

Acting credits

Film

Television

Video games

Music videos

Theater

Discography

Soundtracks

Miscellaneous

Awards and nominations

References

External links

 
 
 

1980 births
American agnostics
American male film actors
American male television actors
American male video game actors
American male voice actors
American people of Russian-Jewish descent
Living people
Male actors from California
Male actors from Los Angeles
People from Los Angeles
People from the San Fernando Valley
Pine family
University of California, Berkeley alumni